Zuhal Olcay (born 10 August 1957) is a Turkish actress and singer.

Biography
Graduated from Ankara State Conservatory in 1976, she first started as a stage actress. Since 1983 she also started acting in films and became famous with films like "Amansız Yol", "Kurşun Ata Ata Biter", "Bir Avuç Gökyüzü", "Halkalı Köle", and "Dünden Sonra Yarından Önce". In 1989 she began a successful singing career.

In 2018, she was sentenced to 10 months in prison for allegedly insulting Turkish President Recep Tayyip Erdoğan. She had reportedly revised the lyrics to the song "Boş Vermişim Dünyayı" (I Let Go of the World), to say "Recep Tayyip Erdoğan, it's all empty, it's all a lie, life will end one day and you'll say 'I had a dream.'" A lawsuit was filed against her by the Istanbul Prosecutor's office for apparently insulting the president during a concert in 2016, seeking a four-year prison sentence.

Olcay was previously fined 10,620 lira ($2,708) for "insulting a public servant" in 2010.

Filmography

Film 
 İhtiras Fırtınası (1983)
 Kurşun Ata Ata Biter (1985)
 Amansız Yol (1985)
 Genç ve Dul (1986)
 İstek (1986)
 Oteldeki Cinayet (1986)
 Halkalı Köle (1986)
 Dünden Sonra Yarından Önce (1987)
 Kara Sevdalı Bulut (1987)
 Bir Avuç Gökyüzü (1987)
 Bir Günah Gibi (1987)
 Gece Yolculuğu (1987)
 Sahte Cennete Veda / Aidu Au Faux Paradis (1988)
 Medcezir Manzaraları (1989)
 Gizli Yüz (1990)
 İki Kadın (1992)
 Ay Vakti (1993)
 Bir Sonbahar Hikayesi (1994)
 Aşk Üzerine Söylenmemiş Herşey (1995)
 80. Adım (1996)
 İstanbul Kanatlarımın Altında (1996)
 Salkım Hanımın Taneleri (1999)
 Hiçbiryerde (2001)
 Simbiyotik (2004)
 Ankara Cinayeti 2006)
 İyi Seneler (2007)
 Mevzuhal (2008)
 Güz Sancısı (2009)
 Aşk Tesadüfleri Sever 2 (2020)

TV series 
 Sönmüş Ocak (1980)
 Parmak Damgası (1985)
 Varsayalım İsmail (1986)
 Gecenin Öteki Yüzü (1987)
 Ateşten Günler (1987)
 Baharın Bittiği Yer (1989)
 Artist Palas (1994)
 Medeni Haller (1997)
 Çatısız Kadınlar (1999)
 Yeditepe İstanbul (2001)
 Seni Çok Özledim (2005)
 Geniş Zamanlar (2007)
 Beni Unutma (2008)
 Arka Sokaklar (2010)
 Umut Yolcuları (2010)
 İffet (2011)
 Bir Aşk Hikayesi (2013)
 Urfalıyam Ezelden (2014)
 Yüksek Sosyete (2016)
 Alev Alev (2020)
 Gecenin Ucunda (2022)

Discography

Solo albums
 Küçük Bir Öykü Bu (1989)
 İki Çift Laf (1990)
 Oyuncu (1993)
 İhanet (1998)
 Başucu Şarkıları (2001)
 Başucu Şarkıları 2 (2005)
 Aşk'ın Halleri (2009)
 Başucu Şarkıları 3 (2015)

Singles
"Dünden Sonra Yarından Önce" (1987)
"Sensiz" (with Emre Atabek) (2018)
"Eyvallah" (with Hüsnü Arkan) (2020)
"Aşkınla Her Şey Oldum" (with Tuna Kiremitçi) (2022)

Other albums
 Asansör Film Müzikleri / Kolektif (1999)
 Bülent Ortaçgil İçin Söylenmiş Bülent Ortaçgil Şarkıları (2000)
 Hiçbiryerde Film Müzikleri (2002)
 Metin Altıok Ağıtı (2003)
 Söz Vermiş Şarkılar (2004)
 41 Kere Maşallah (2006)
 Nazım / Fazıl Say (2006)
 Pop 2006 (2006)
 Bulutsuzluk Özlemi 20 Yaşında (2007)
 Güldünya Şarkıları (2008)
 Mucize Nağmeler (2009)
 Buğra Uğur'la 30 Yıl (2009)
 2020 Model (2020 Model: Murathan Mungan) (2020)

References

External links
 
 Zuhal Olcay's official website
 Biyografi.info - Biography of Zuhal Olcay

1957 births
Living people
People from Üsküdar
Turkish stage actresses
Turkish film actresses
Turkish women singers
Turkish pop singers
Turkish-language singers
Best Supporting Actress Golden Orange Award winners
Best Actress Golden Orange Award winners
Best Actress Golden Boll Award winners
Best Actress German Film Award winners
Actresses from Istanbul
Singers from Istanbul
20th-century Turkish actresses
Ankara State Conservatory alumni